The murder of Walter Lübcke occurred on 2 June 2019 in Wolfhagen-Istha, Germany, near the city of Kassel. Walter Lübcke, the head of the public administration of the Kassel region, was killed in front of his home by a shot to the head at close range. On 15 June 2019, right-wing extremist Stephan Ernst was arrested as the prime suspect. On 25 June 2019, he made a confession, which he recanted on 2 July 2019. He was convicted of murder on 28 January 2021.

Lübcke had spoken out for the admittance of refugees and had opposed agitation against them by the local offshoot of the far-right political movement Pegida at a public meeting in October 2015. He subsequently received numerous death threats for many years.

Lübcke's murder and its background and consequences started a broad public debate in Germany, due to which right-wing terrorism, executed by Combat 18 and related fascist organizations and individuals, received more scrutiny. The debate concerns the German security authorities' knowledge of the suspects, the possible co-responsibility of the right-wing populist party Alternative for Germany (AfD) for the murder, the relationship of the major political party Christian Democratic Union of Germany (CDU) with the AfD, increasingly frequent attacks on local politicians, and the lack of prosecution of hate crimes in social networking services and social media.

Assassination
He had been shot in the head at close range with an illegally owned Rossi .38 revolver. On 15 June 2019, 45-year-old suspect Stephan Ernst was arrested.

Perpetrator
Stephan Ernst was born in 1973 in Wiesbaden and grew up in Holzhausen, a part of the town of Hohenstein (Untertaunus), since 1984. He is married and the father of two children. He lived in the eastern part of Kassel.

At the time of Lübcke's murder, Ernst was already known to have held extreme right-wing political views and to have had connections to the German branch of the neo-Nazi terrorist group Combat 18 (C18). He also had connections to the far-right National Democratic Party of Germany (NPD) and the Alternative fur Deutschland (AfD) parties.

Ernst had been previously convicted for knife and bomb attacks against targets connected to ethnic minorities in Germany.

After he retracted his confession, he was formally charged with murder on 29 April 2020 and went on trial for the crime in June, along with his alleged accomplice Markus H. Ernst was convicted on 28 January 2021 and sentenced to life imprisonment. Markus H. was acquitted of accessory to murder but convicted of illegal gun possession.

See also
Murder of Jo Cox, a similar assassination

References

2019 crimes in Germany
21st century in Hesse
Crime in Hesse
Hate crimes in Europe
Neo-Nazi attacks in Germany
June 2019 events in Germany
2019 in Germany
2019 murders in Germany
Assassinated German politicians
June 2019 crimes in Europe
Kassel
Terrorist incidents in Germany in 2019